Phuwaryne Keenan; born 27 October 1988), or nicknamed Zee, is a Thai actor, singer and model. He became a media figure after singing "Ngai Ngai Tae Ngao" (Simply but Lonely).

Early life and education
Keenan was born in Phuket, to an Irish father and an Indonesian mother. He has two older sisters whose names are Lisa and Cathy. He studied Humanities and Journalism at Ramkhamhaeng University.

Accident
On May 28, 2012, he had an accident when a pickup-car collided with him while he was running across the street. He was admitted to the ICU. Now, recovered, he plans to continue working in the entertainment industry.

Career
Zee has been a model in Thai magazines, such as "TomAct" and "I Like". He has many music videos, such as "Ter Kei Rak Chun Jing Jing Rue Pao" (Have You Ever Really Loved Me?). He is affiliated with RS (Rose Sound). In addition, he has been in Auntie Anne’s and Eversense advertising. Also, he is a presenter of Secant Brand which is a clothing brand for Thai tomboys.

Personal Life 
Zee is a trans man.

Music Works

MC and ADS
Zee To Sea at YAAK TV
Eversense
 Auntie Anne's

References

Phuwaryne Keenan
1988 births
Living people
Phuwaryne Keenan
Phuwaryne Keenan
Phuwaryne Keenan
Phuwaryne Keenan
Transgender artists
Phuwaryne Keenan